Señorita República Dominicana 1981 was held on May 9, 1980. There were 20 candidates who competed for the national crown. The winner represented the Dominican Republic at the Miss Universe 1981 . The Señorita República Dominicana Mundo entered Miss World 1981. The Señorita República Dominicana Café would entered Reinado Internacional del Café 1981.

Results

Delegates

Azua - Martha Landro
Baoruco - Minorka Sevilla
Distrito Nacional - Alicia Jerez Morillo
Distrito Nacional - Ana María Castellanos Tatís
Distrito Nacional - Catalina Pastrana
Distrito Nacional - Dilia Marina Mieses Méndez 
Distrito Nacional - Jatna Tavarez Portíllo
Distrito Nacional - Raimiris Herrera
Duarte - Josefina María Cuello Pérez
Elías Piña - Maira de la Cruz
Independencia - María Isabel Cohén
María Trinidad Sánchez - Ceneyda Acosta
Pedernales - Angelica Hernández
Peravia - Jacqueline Batista
Puerto Plata - Fausta Lucía Peña Veras
Samaná - Belkis Valencia Padrón
Sánchez Ramírez - Eva Adam Espinal Vargas
Santiago - Niurbis Margarita Rosario Ureña
Seibo - Altagracia Goico Hidalgo
Valverde - Yadira Abud Diloné

External links
 https://web.archive.org/web/20090211102742/http://ogm.elcaribe.com.do/ogm/consulta.aspx

Miss Dominican Republic
1981 beauty pageants
1981 in the Dominican Republic